Stefano Sommariva (27 April 1918 – 7 July 2007) was an Italian cross-country skier. He competed in the men's 50 kilometre event at the 1948 Winter Olympics.

References

External links
 

1918 births
2007 deaths
Italian male cross-country skiers
Olympic cross-country skiers of Italy
Cross-country skiers at the 1948 Winter Olympics
Place of birth missing